Soča Reggae Riversplash was a music festival in Tolmin, Slovenia at the confluence of the Soča and the Tolminka rivers. It mainly features reggae music by international musicians.

1st Soča Reggae Riversplash 2000 (July 13–15), Tolmin (confluence)

New Born Creation (The Netherlands)

2nd Soča Reggae Riversplash 2001 (July 12–14), Tolmin (confluence)

3rd Soča Reggae Riversplash 2002 (July 11–14), Tolmin (confluence)

4th Soča Reggae Riversplash 2003 (July 10–13), Tolmin (confluence)
 Zion Train (United Kingdom) 
 B.R. Stylers (Italy) 
 Dubblestandart (Austria)
 Radical Dub Kolektiv (Croatia)
 Mikey Dread (Jamaica)
 Gentleman (Germany) 
 Terrakota (Portugal)
 Irie Vibes (Slovenia)
 Sly Asher & The Rooters (France)
 Del Arno Band (Serbia & Montenegro)
 Sista (United Kingdom)
 Benjamin Zephaniah & Sista (United Kingdom)
 Djambi (Brazil)
 Eyesburn (Serbia and Montenegro)
 Superhiks (Republic of Macedonia)
 Paprika Korps (Poland)
 Red Five Point Star (Slovenia)

5th Soča Reggae Riversplash 2004 (July 15–18), Tolmin (confluence)
 Brain Holidays (Croatia)
 Siti hlapci (Slovenia)
 Headcornerstone (Germany)
 Culture feat. Joseph Hill
 The Pokerheads (Slovenia)
 HUMb (Belgium)
 Go Lem System (Argentina / Spain)
 Natural Black (Jamaica)
 Artikal Crew (France)
 R.A.S.M.C. & Mutant Dance (Serbia and Montenegro)
 Fake Orchestra (Slovenia)
 Djambi (Brasil)
 Julian Marley & The Uprising (Jamaica)
 Dub Rebellion (Bosnia and Hercegovina / Jamaica)
 Dubital & Bomba Bomba (Italy)
 Dubians (France)
 B.R. Stylers (Italy)
 Prince Alla (Jamaica)

See also
List of reggae festivals
Reggae

References

External links
Soca Reggae Riversplash
Soca river

Reggae festivals
Music festivals in Slovenia
July events
Music festivals established in 2000
Summer events in Slovenia